Dynamo Alma-Ata was the bandy department of the sports club Dynamo Alma-Ata in Alma-Ata (now Almaty) in Kazakhstan at the time of the Soviet Union. The club was established in 1932 and disbanded in 1995, just some years after Kazakhstan became independent.

In 1977 and in 1990, the club became Soviet national champions in bandy. The club also won the silver in 1973, 1975, 1976, 1978, 1979, 1981 and the bronze in 1966, 1967, 1971, 1974, and 1983.

In 1978, the club won the European Cup, beating Edsbyns IF in the final.

Honours

International
 European Cup:
 Winners (1): 1978

References

Bandy clubs in the Soviet Union
Bandy clubs in Kazakhstan
Bandy clubs established in 1932
Sport in Almaty
Dynamo sports society